The Battle of Rottofreddo was fought on 10 August 1746 during the War of Austrian Succession between a French army and Austrian forces.  The French were led by Marshal Maillebois, and could repel the Austrian attack, but had to withdraw after the battle.

The battle

After the defeat at Piacenza the French and Spanish army had to retreat across the Po river. The Austrian commander Antoniotto Botta Adorno tried to prevent this and send Count Serbelloni with the vanguard to attack. The Bourbon Army defended the town of Rottofreddo till their baggage train crossed the Tidone to the west, but were then overwhelmed by the Austrian mainforce. During the following attack against the main French army at Castel San Giovanni Austrian field marshal Bärenklau tried a flank attack in the south, but was hit by a musket ball and died shortly after. The French and Spanish could hold their line but finally decided to retreat to Tortona. In the aftermath Piacenza surrendered to Austrian General Nádasdy, but the following invasion of the Provence should end in failure. Nevertheless Italy was secured for the Austrians.

References

Sources 
 World History at KMLA
 Janko, Wilhelm Edler von, "Bärenklau zu Schönreith, Johann Leopold Freiherr von" in: Allgemeine Deutsche Biographie 2 (1875), S. 59 [Online-Version]; URL: https://www.deutsche-biographie.de/gnd135853958.html#adbcontent GERMAN
Plan de la Battaille donnée de l'Armée Imperiale Royale d'Hongrie à l'Armée Espagnole Francaise le 10te. Aug. 1746 en Italie près de la Ville Piazenza au Torrent Didionne; URL: https://arcinsys.hessen.de/arcinsys/detailAction?detailid=v4085879 FRENCH
Bodart, Gaston, Militär-historisches Kriegs-Lexikon (1618-1905), Wien 1908, p. 209. GERMAN

Battles involving France
Battles involving Austria
Conflicts in 1746
1746 in Austria
1746 in France
1746 in Italy
Rottofreddo